CS-27349, or L-2-α-tropinyl benzilate, is an experimental incapacitating agent. It acts as an antagonist to muscarinic acetylcholine receptors, causing delirium. It has 37% of the potency of the related compound 3-quinuclidinyl benzilate (BZ) in producing peripheral effects, but 85% of the potency in producing central effects. The mean dose required to incapacitate subjects was 1.2 times that of BZ. It has not been in use since the 1970s, and there have been no publications about its effects or long-term toxicology since then.

References

Muscarinic antagonists
Deliriants
Incapacitating agents
Chemical weapons of the United States
Benzilate esters